Jemima Shore Investigates is a British mystery television series which originally aired in twelve episodes in 1983. It is based on a series of novels by Antonia Fraser about Jemima Shore, a crime-solving television presenter.

Actors who appeared in episodes of the series include Anthony Steel, Constance Cummings, Lysette Anthony, Stratford Johns, Patrick Newell, Tom Baker, Malcolm Stoddard, Michael Balfour, Billy Milton, Hugh Burden, Oliver Cotton, Don Henderson, Bill Nighy, Zena Walker, Brian Cox, Donald Houston, Larry Lamb, Brian Oulton, Derek Francis, Nicholas Le Prevost, George Coulouris and Elizabeth Counsell.

Main cast
 Patricia Hodge as  Jemima Shore
 Sally Watts as Cherry Bronson
 Ian Hendry as  Cy
 Norman Jones as Pompey
 Kathleen Worth as Mrs. Bancroft

References

Bibliography
 Mitzi Brunsdale. Gumshoes: A Dictionary of Fictional Detectives. Greenwood Publishing Group, 2006.

External links
 

ITV television dramas
1983 British television series debuts
1983 British television series endings
1980s British drama television series
1980s British mystery television series
1980s British television miniseries
Television series by Fremantle (company)
Television shows produced by Thames Television
English-language television shows
Television shows based on British novels